Nightflyers is a 1987 American science fiction horror film based on Nightflyers, a 1980 novella by George R. R. Martin.

Plot
The film is about a group of scientists who begin a space voyage to find a mysterious alien being, and in the process are victimized by the ship's malevolent computer.

Cast
 Catherine Mary Stewart as Miranda Dorlac
 Michael Praed as Royd Eris
 John Standing as Michael D'Brannin
 Lisa Blount as Audrey
 Glenn Withrow as Keelor
 James Avery as Darryl
 Annabel Brooks as Eliza
 Michael Des Barres as Jon Winderman

Production

Development
The film is based on a novella that appears in George R. R. Martin's 1985 short story collection. Originally written in 1980, the 23,000-word novella was published by Analog Science Fiction and Fact. In 1981, at the request of his editor at the time, James Frenkel, Martin expanded the story into a 30,000-word piece, which was published by Dell Publishing, together with Vernor Vinge's True Names, as part of their Binary Star series. In the extended version, Martin supplied additional backstory on several characters, and named secondary characters which were not named in the original version.

Nightflyers is set in the same fictional "Thousand Worlds" universe as several of Martin's other works, including Dying of the Light, Sandkings, A Song for Lya, "The Way of Cross and Dragon", "With Morning Comes Mistfall", and the stories collected in Tuf Voyaging.

Adaptation
Screen and television rights were purchased by Vista in 1984, which produced a 1987 film adaptation with a screenplay co-written by Martin, with writer/producer Robert Jaffe. It was directed by Robert Collector, using the pseudonym "T. C. Blake" as he left before post-production was completed. According to Martin, writer/producer Robert Jaffe probably adapted his script from the shorter novella version, since all the secondary characters had different names than the ones he chose in the expanded version. The film grossed $1,149,470. Martin was unhappy about having to cut plot elements in order to accommodate the film's small budget. While not a hit at theatres, Martin believes that the film saved his career, and that everything he has written since exists in large part because of it.

Home media
The film was released on VHS, Betamax, and LaserDisc in 1988 by International Video Entertainment.

References

External links
 
 Martin on Nightflyers

1987 films
1987 horror films
American science fiction horror films
1980s science fiction horror films
Films about artificial intelligence
Films about astronauts
Films about scientists
Films directed by Robert Collector
Films set on spacecraft
1980s English-language films
1980s American films